Governor Mason may refer to:

Charles H. Mason (1830–1859), Acting Governor of Washington
John Mason (governor) (1586–1635), 2nd Proprietary Governor of Newfoundland's Cuper's Cove colony
Richard Barnes Mason (1797–1850), military governor of California
Sandra Mason (born 1949), Governor-General of Barbados
Stevens T. Mason (1811–1843), 1st Governor of Michigan